The 1992 Australian motorcycle Grand Prix was the second round of the 1992 Grand Prix motorcycle racing season. It took place on the weekend of 10–12 April 1992 at Eastern Creek Raceway.

500 cc race report
John Kocinski was injured in practice and missed the race.

Mick Doohan started on pole, and led away with Wayne Rainey and they swapped places, with Daryl Beattie in 3rd. Kevin Schwantz and Doug Chandler battled for 4th.

500 cc classification

References

Australian motorcycle Grand Prix
Australian
Motorcycle
Motorsport at Eastern Creek Raceway
April 1992 sports events in Australia